Erblira Bici (born 27 June 1995) is an Albanian volleyball player, who plays as an opposite spiker. She currently plays for Cuneo Granda Volley.

Career
Erblira's career began in 2005 when she played for team from her birthplace. She made her debut in first division of the Albanian championship in 2010–11 season with KV Tirana, in which she stayed three years, winning two Albanian Cup two times and the championship in 2012–13 season. In the 2013–14 season she was signed by Barleti Volley with which she won three national cups and three championships for the three years; in 2014 she obtained the first participation in the Albania national team.

In 2016 she was moved to Italy, to the Pallavolo Mondovì, in Serie A2, where he remained for two years, before moving to the AGIL Volley from Novara in Serie A1, in 2018, and there she won 2018–19 Italian Cup and the 2018–19 Champions League and thus became the first Albanian player to win the top-tier European club volleyball competition.

Clubs
 KV Tirana (2010–2013)
 Barleti Volley (2013–2016)
 Pallavolo Mondovì (2016–2018)
 Igor Gorgonzola Novara (2018–2019)
 Futura Volley Busto Arsizio (2019–2020)
 Cuneo Granda Volley (2020-Current)

Achievements
 2012 Albanian Cup —  Champions, with KV Tirana
 2012–13 Albanian Championship -  Champion, with KV Tirana
 2013 Albanian Cup —  Champions, with KV Tirana
 2013–14, 2014–15, 2015–16 Albanian Championship -  Champion, with Barleti Volley
 2014, 2015, 2016 Albanian Cup —  Champions, with Barleti Volley
 2018–19 CEV Champions League —  Champions, with Igor Gorgonzola Novara
 2019 Italian Cup —  Champions, with Igor Gorgonzola Novara

References

External links
CEV profile

1995 births
Living people
Albanian women's volleyball players
Albanian expatriate sportspeople in Italy
Expatriate volleyball players in Italy
People from Gramsh, Elbasan
Outside hitters
Serie A1 (women's volleyball) players